Ernst Marmsoler was an Italian luger who competed in the 1980s. A natural track luger, he won the silver medal in the men's doubles event at the 1989 FIL European Luge Natural Track Championships in Garmisch-Partenkirchen, West Germany. In 1981, he also won a bronze medal in the men's doubles event at the 15th European Cup in Unterammergau.

References

Natural track European Championships results 1970-2006 (Internet Archive)
Luge - Natural Track European Championships - Men: Doubles results at Sports123.com

Year of birth missing (living people)
Living people
Italian male lugers